Seokhyo Jang (born 27 October 1957) is president and CEO of the Korea Gas Corporation (KOGAS) and chairman of the Korea Gas Union (KGU). Jang came through alongside South Korea's entry into the world gas market and became a prominent member of the emerging gas market in Asia.

Background
Jang graduated from Jungdong High School in Seoul in 1975. He received a BA in business and economics from Inha University in 1982 and joined KOGAS the next year. In 1989, he received an MBA from the University of Minnesota Duluth, with a dissertation on economic policies in South Korea during the post-Park Chung-hee era.

Work at KOGAS
Jang has been the president and CEO of KOGAS since 2013. KOGAS is the largest LNG buyer in the world and operates four LNG terminals in South Korea. He is the first president to have been appointed from within the company. Prior to becoming CEO, Jang worked with global partners in LNG purchasing and has experience in marketing and resource divisions. He is credited with developing a close working relationship with other buyers in Asia to ensure security in energy demand and supply.

In addition to business endeavors, Jang has been behind KOGAS's increased involvement in CSR programs. In 2014, KOGAS ran a training program in South Korea for teams in Iraq and supported training programs and gas pipeline construction in Mozambique.

Work at KGU
Since 2013, Jang has also been the chairman of the Korea Gas Union, representing more than 70 local companies and organizations in the industry. He is currently South Korea's candidate for the presidency of the International Gas Union.

References

External links
 Korea Gas Corporation official website

1956 births
Living people
People from Seoul
Inha University alumni
University of Minnesota Duluth alumni
South Korean chief executives